Flemming Quach (born 11 April 1992) is a Danish male badminton player. He was born in Aarhus (Denmark) to Vietnamese parents.

Achievements

BWF International Challenge/Series
Men's Singles

 BWF International Challenge tournament
 BWF International Series tournament
 BWF Future Series tournament

References

External links
 

1992 births
Living people
Sportspeople from Aarhus
Danish male badminton players
Badminton players at the 2010 Summer Youth Olympics
Danish people of Vietnamese descent